Ghazi Chaouachi (Arabic: غازي الشواشي ), born on February 5, 1963, is a Tunisian lawyer and politician.

He was elected to the Assembly of the Representatives of the People  in 2004 and he is the co-founder and current Secretary General of the Democratic Current.

In 2020, he became Minister of State Property and Land Affairs and then interim Minister of Equipment, Housing and Spatial Planning.

References

1963 births
Living people
Tunisian politicians
Democratic Current politicians